In computing, a modifier key is a special key (or combination) on a computer keyboard that temporarily modifies the normal action of another key when pressed together.

For example, in most keyboard layouts the Shift key combination  will produce a capital letter "A" instead of the default lower-case letter "a" (unless in Caps lock or Shift lock mode). In contrast, pressing just  or  will probably do nothing unless assigned a specific function in a particular program (for example, activating input aids or the toolbar of the active window in Windows).

User interface expert Jef Raskin coined the term "quasimode" to describe the state a computer enters into when a modifier key is pressed.

Modifier keys on personal computers
The most common are:
 
  (Control)
  (Alternate) – also labelled  on Apple keyboards.
  (Alternate Graphic)
  – Meta key, found on MIT, Symbolics, and Sun Microsystems keyboards.
  – Super key, found on MIT, Symbolics, Linux, and BSD keyboards.
  (Windows logo) – found on Windows keyboards.
  – Command key, found on Apple keyboards. On older keyboards labelled  (Apple logo).
  (Function) – often present on small-layout keyboards, or keyboard where the top row of function keys have multimedia functions like controlling volume attached.

The (Sun) Meta key, Windows key, (Apple) Cmd key, and the analogous "Amiga key"() on Amiga computers, are usually handled equivalently. Under the Linux operating system, the desktop environment KDE calls this key Meta, while GNOME calls this key, neutrally, Super.  (This is a bit confusing, since the original space-cadet keyboard and the X Window System recognize a "" modifier distinct from "".)

The ZX Spectrum has a Symbol Shift key in addition to Caps Shift. This was used to access additional punctuation and keywords.

The MSX computer keyboard, besides Shift and Control, also included two special modifier keys, Code and Graph. In some models, as in the Brazilian Gradiente Expert, the Code and Graph keys are labelled "" and "" (Left and Right Graphics). They are used to select special graphic symbols and extended characters. 

Likewise, the Commodore 64 and other Commodore computers had the Commodore key at the bottom left of the keyboard.

Compact keyboards, such as those used in laptops, often have a Fn key to save space by combining two functions that are normally on separate keys.  On laptops, pressing  plus one of the function keys, e.g., F2, often control hardware functions. Keyboards that lack a dedicated numeric keypad may mimic its functionality by combining the Fn key with other keys.

The MIT space-cadet keyboard had additional Top, Front, Super and Hyper modifier keys. Combined with standard modifiers, it could enter as many as 8,000 different characters.

Accented characters
Some non-English language keyboards have special keys to produce accented modifications of the standard Latin-letter keys. In fact, the standard British keyboard layout includes an accent key on the top-left corner to produce àèìòù, although this is a two step procedure, with the user pressing the accent key, releasing, then pressing the letter key. These kinds of keys are called dead keys. The AltGr modifier produces the áéíóú sequence, or in conjunction with the Shift key, ÁÉÍÓÚ. Keyboards of some languages simply include the accented characters on their own keys. Some keyboards also have a Compose key for typing accented and other special characters.  By pressing , and then two other keys, something similar to a combination of the glyphs of the two previous keys will appear on the screen.

Dual-role keys 
It is possible to use (with some utility software) one key both as a normal key and as a modifier.

For example, you can use the  both as a normal Space bar and as a Shift. Intuitively, it will act as a standard Space when you want a whitespace, and a Shift when you want it to act as a shift.

The above example is known as "SandS", standing for "Space and Shift" in Japan. But any number of any combinations are possible.

To press shift+space in the previous example, you need in addition to a space/shift dual role key, one of (a) another space/shift key, (b) a usual shift, or (c) a usual space key.

See also
 Bucky bit
 Control character
 Function key
 Keyboard layout
 Space-cadet keyboard
 Table of keyboard shortcuts
 Emacs pinky - repetitive strain injury developed by too much use of control key, notably for Emacs users.

References

External links
 Bucky bits in the Jargon file

Computer keys
User interface techniques

de:Tastenkombination#Hilfstasten für Tastenkombinationen